Is Is is Yeah Yeah Yeahs' third EP released on July 24, 2007. Songs for the EP were written in 2004 in between touring behind the band's first record Fever to Tell. The song "Down Boy" was No. 61 on Rolling Stones list of the 100 Best Songs of 2007.

The EP
Written amidst a turbulent and emotionally unstable period in Yeah Yeah Yeahs' history, the angst that colored that time translates into a sexually charged body of songs. On their choice of producer, Karen O stated, "Nick Launay was the natural choice having produced PiL Flowers of Romance, collectively a favorite between us. I put that record on and want to stuff my mouth with raw hamburger meat."

The EP has been released on CD, double 7" vinyl, USB flash drive and digital download.

"Down Boy" was originally released as a split single with Liars only released in Australia and Japan. The album title is an extraction of the fourth track song Isis, which in turn is an extraction of the Egyptian goddess Isis.

The video
The band made a live film to accompany the EP with co-directors K. K. Barrett and Lance Bangs. Recorded in night vision at Glasslands Gallery in Brooklyn on 7 May, the band played two sets that night to 100 fans each time—the first for a mixed audience and the second for females only. There will be two filmed versions of lead track "Down Boy"—one live, and one to EP audio.

Three of these live videos, and the EP audio version of "Down Boy", have been uploaded to their official YouTube channel.

Track listing

Personnel
 Brian Chase – drums
 Nick Zinner – guitars, synthesizer
 Karen O – vocals

Charts

References

External links
 

Yeah Yeah Yeahs albums
2007 EPs
Albums produced by Nick Launay
Polydor Records EPs
Interscope Records EPs
Modular Recordings EPs